The 2008 CSI Gijón was the 2008 edition of the Gijón show jumping horse show, at Las Mestas Sports Complex in Gijón. This edition of the CSIO Gijón was held between 23 and 28 July 2008.

This was the first time since 1991, that the contest was not held as official, as this year was in Madrid, with the aim to promote the Madrid bid for the 2016 Summer Olympics.

Gijón Grand Prix
The Gijón Grand Prix, the Show jumping Grand Prix of the 2008 CSIO Gijón, was the major show jumping competition at this event. It was held on 28 July 2008. The competition was a show jumping competition over two rounds, the height of the fences were up to 1.60 meters.

It was endowed with 150,000 €.

(Top 10 of 41 Competitors)

References

External links
Special website for the event at El Comercio
Official website

CSIO Gijón
2008 in show jumping